The canton of Ambert is an administrative division of the Puy-de-Dôme department, central France. Its borders were modified at the French canton reorganisation which came into effect in March 2015. Its seat is in Ambert.

It consists of the following communes:
 
Ambert
Arlanc
Baffie
Beurières
Champétières
La Chaulme
Chaumont-le-Bourg
Doranges
Dore-l'Église
Églisolles
La Forie
Grandrif
Job
Mayres
Marsac-en-Livradois
Medeyrolles
Novacelles
Saillant
Saint-Anthème
Saint-Alyre-d'Arlanc
Saint-Clément-de-Valorgue
Saint-Ferréol-des-Côtes
Saint-Just
Saint-Martin-des-Olmes
Saint-Romain
Sauvessanges
Saint-Sauveur-la-Sagne
Thiolières
Valcivières
Viverols

References

Cantons of Puy-de-Dôme